Vila Chã is a civil parish (freguesia) in the Portuguese municipality of Vale de Cambra with a population of 4133 (2001).

References

Instituto Nacional de Estatistica, 2001 Census, accessed at http://www.ine.pt/

Freguesias of Vale de Cambra